The Changeling is a 1980 Canadian supernatural psychological horror film directed by Peter Medak and starring George C. Scott, Trish Van Devere, and Melvyn Douglas. Its plot follows an esteemed New York City composer who relocates to Seattle, Washington, where he moves into a mansion he comes to believe is haunted. The screenplay is based upon events that writer Russell Hunter claimed he experienced while he was living in the Henry Treat Rogers mansion in the Cheesman Park neighborhood of Denver, Colorado, in the late 1960s; Hunter served as a co-writer of the film.

The film premiered at the USA Film Festival in Dallas, Texas on March 26, 1980, and was released simultaneously in Canada and the United States two days later. It received positive critical reviews, and was an early Canadian-produced film to have major success internationally. The film won eight inaugural Genie Awards, including Best Motion Picture, and was nominated for two Saturn Awards. It is considered a cult film and one of the most influential Canadian films of all time.

Plot 
John Russell, a composer from New York City, moves to Seattle following the deaths of his wife and daughter in a traffic accident while having car trouble. He soon views and rents a mansion from an agent of the local historic society, Claire Norman, who tells him that the property has been vacant for twelve years.

Not long after moving in, John begins to experience unexplained phenomena, starting with a loud banging every morning. One night, he discovers all of the water taps turned on and sees the apparition of a drowned boy in a bathtub. Soon after a red stained glass window pane shatters as he is outside and, upon investigation, he finds a locked, boarded up door in a closet leading to a hidden attic bedroom. John takes a music box from the mantel and discovers it plays the exact piano tune he has just recorded downstairs. John and Claire investigate the history of the house, believing that the ghost is that of a young girl killed outside the house in a traffic accident in 1909. John holds a seance and overhears the voice of the spirit on audio equipment, calling himself Joseph Carmichael.

John discovers that Joseph Carmichael was a crippled and sickly six-year-old who was murdered in 1906 by his father Richard because he was unlikely to reach the age of 21, upon which he would have inherited an enormous fortune from his late grandfather. To ensure the inheritance, Richard replaced the dead boy with one procured from a local orphanage and spirited him away to Europe under the pretense of seeking treatment for his condition. After years away, he returned with the boy when he was 18, claiming that he was cured. The boy is now an old man, a prominent U.S. Senator who is also a major patron of the historical society that owns the house where his adoptive father committed the murder.

John's investigation leads him to a property built on land that was once owned by the Carmichael family, where he believes the body of the murdered boy, the real Joseph Carmichael, was dumped in a well. There, he finds the skeleton of a young child with his christening medal. John attempts to speak to Senator Carmichael but is restrained. The Senator is disturbed to see the medal, as it is identical to the one in his possession given to him by his adoptive father. The society cancels John's lease on the house and fires Claire. Senator Carmichael sends a detective, DeWitt, to John's home in an attempt to intimidate him and retrieve the medal. John refuses, and when DeWitt leaves to obtain a search warrant, his vehicle mysteriously crashes, killing him.

After DeWitt's death, Senator Carmichael agrees to meet with John; John tells him the story. Carmichael angrily berates John for accusing his adoptive father of murder. John leaves the skeleton's christening medal, along with the only copy of the seance recording, and apologizes. Claire goes to the house to find John and is chased by Joseph's wheelchair until she falls down the stairs. When John arrives the house begins to shake. He tries to appease Joseph's ghost but falls from the second floor as Joseph's ghost sets the house on fire. Simultaneously, Senator Carmichael compares the two medals, and, realizing the truth, he falls into a trance staring at the portrait of his adoptive father. John witnesses the Senator's astral body climbing the burning stairs to Joseph's room. Claire rescues John while Carmichael witnesses the murder of the boy Joseph and suffers a fatal heart attack. John and Claire see the Senator's body being loaded into the ambulance.

The next morning, Joseph's burnt wheelchair sits amid the ruins of the mansion and his music box begins playing a lullaby.

Cast

Production

Screenplay 
The film's screenplay was inspired by mysterious events that allegedly took place at the Henry Treat Rogers mansion in Cheesman Park, Denver, Colorado, while playwright Russell Hunter was living there during the 1960s. After experiencing a series of unexplained phenomena, Hunter said he found a century-old journal in a hidden room detailing the life of a disabled boy who was kept in isolation by his parents. During a séance, he claimed, the spirit of a deceased boy directed him to another house, where he discovered human remains and a gold medallion bearing the dead boy's name. Henry Treat Rogers, a wealthy Denver attorney, was childless; but prior inhabitants of the house remain undocumented. The mansion was demolished during the 1980s and replaced with a high-rise apartment building.

Filming 
While The Changeling is set in Seattle, most of its scenes were filmed in the British Columbian cities of Vancouver and Victoria, and their environs. Exceptions include introductory location shooting in New York City, New York and establishing shots of Seattle points of interest, including SeaTac Airport, University of Washington's Red Square, the Space Needle, the Rainier Tower, and the Lacey V. Murrow Memorial Bridge. Interior college scenes were shot at the University of Washington.  The Historical Society was Vancouver's historic Hotel Europe. The senator's home was Hatley Castle on the grounds of Royal Roads Military College (now Royal Roads University) in Victoria.  Exterior shots of Russell's home were filmed using a facade, erected in front of an existing home in South Vancouver.  The haunted mansion's interior was a series of interconnected sets at Panorama Studios in West Vancouver.

Peter Medak was the third director hired for the project.  His predecessors, Donald Cammell and Tony Richardson, both withdrew due to "creative differences". Medak was hired with only a month to facilitate script re-writes and set construction.

Release

Critical response 
Roger Ebert of the Chicago Sun-Times wrote in his review of the film: "If it only took craftsmanship to make a haunted house movie, The Changeling would be a great one. It has all the technical requirements, beginning with the haunted house itself... [the film] does have some interesting ideas... But it doesn't have that sneaky sense of awful things about to happen. Scott makes the hero so rational, normal and self-possessed that we never feel he's in real danger; we go through this movie with too much confidence." Edwin Miller of Seventeen wrote that the film was a "visually classy chiller... aided by stunning film locations." Richard Grenier of Cosmopolitan praised Medak's direction, but added: "it is Scott, using the full range of his immense talent, who gives the story its spine-tingling impact," and deemed it the best horror film of the year. Variety also praised the film, noting it as a "superior haunted house thriller."

Ed Blank of the Pittsburgh Press referred to the film as "an unexceptional but diverting horror story with better-than-average performers." A review published in Florida Today praised the film as "the best ghost story of the year," noting Medak's direction as "brilliant," and likening it to The Innocents. The Arizona Republics Michael Maza wrote a less favorable review, calling the film "a sure-thing haunted house story" and "routine picture" supplemented with "formulaic eerie noises, cobwebbed stairways, crashing glassware and unbelievable coincidences." In The Morning News, the film was noted as a "good ghost story... George C. Scott's demonic energy works well for him here, giving a force and power that might elude a weaker actor. Trish Vandevere is appealing in the role of the historic society woman and Melvyn Douglas is superb as a crusty old millionaire."

Fiona Ferguson of Time Out was critical of the plot, noting: "the leaps made by Scott's agile mind in identifying both victim and usurper leave logic and credence on the starting block." Film 4 noted the film as "a minor classic" and "underrated member of the haunted house movie genre."

On the review aggregator website Rotten Tomatoes, The Changeling holds a 83% approval rating based on 23 reviews, with an average rating of 7.49/10. The consensus reads: "George C. Scott's somber performance gives this haunted house horror a moving soul to go along with its harrowing scares."

Home media 
The film was released on LaserDisc with an analog stereo soundtrack by HBO Videos in 1983. The film was also released on DVD by HBO Home Video in 2000. The independent distributor Severin Films announced a limited edition Blu-ray release of the film, which was released in the United States on August 7, 2018.

Awards and recognition 
The Changeling won the first ever Genie Award for Best Canadian Film. It also won the following Genie Awards:
 Best Foreign Actor - George C. Scott
 Best Foreign Actress - Trish Van Devere
 Best Adapted Screenplay - William Gray and Diana Maddox
 Best Art Design - Trevor Williams
 Best Cinematography - John Coquillon
 Best Sound - Joe Grimaldi, Austin Grimaldi, Dino Pigat, Karl Scherer
 Best Sound Editing - Patrick Drummond, Dennis Drummond, Robert Grieve

This film was No. 54 on Bravo's 100 Scariest Movie Moments. Director Martin Scorsese placed The Changeling on his list of the 11 scariest horror films of all time.

Soundtrack 
The soundtrack to The Changeling was released by Percepto Records on CD on December 21, 2001 and was limited to 1,000 copies. On April 13, 2007, Percepto released a 2-CD "Deluxe Edition" of the soundtrack, which was also limited to 1,000 copies and has subsequently been sold out.

 Deluxe edition

Additional music 
Music from the film also included:
 Mozart, Rondo in A minor for Piano, K. 511
 Brahms, Symphony #1 in C minor, Opus 68
 Brahms, Scherzo from Quintet in F minor, Opus 34

Planned remake 
In 2018, a remake was set up at international sales company Cornerstone Films and German production company X Filme, with Joel B. Michaels returning to produce. Mark Steven Johnson was attached as writer and director, and the setting would be relocated to Venice, Italy. Two years later, Anders Engström replaced Johnson and the setting was changed to Ireland. Tab Murphy was brought on as screenwriter, who claimed that the film would be more of a "reimagining" than a remake. He promised a three-page outline to Michaels, who he had previously worked with on Last of the Dogmen, and came back with 33 pages instead. Cornerstone also shopped the film to the Marché du Film that year.

Related works 
In 1987, Italian director Lamberto Bava directed Until Death, an unofficial made-for-television film that was marketed as a sequel for its home video releases; however, there is no connection between the films.

See also 
 List of ghost films

References

Works cited

External links 
 
 
 
 The Changeling at iHorror

1980 films
1980 horror films
English-language Canadian films
1980s English-language films
Films about child death
Canadian horror thriller films
Canadian supernatural horror films
Canadian ghost films
Haunted house films
1980 thriller films
Best Picture Genie and Canadian Screen Award winners
Films directed by Peter Medak
Films set in Seattle
Films set in Washington (state)
Films shot in British Columbia
Films set in country houses
Filicide in fiction
1980s Canadian films